The 1942 All-Big Six Conference football team consists of American football players chosen by various organizations for All-Big Six Conference teams for the 1942 college football season.  The selectors for the 1942 season included the Associated Press (AP).

All-Big Six selections

Backs
 Huell Hamm, Oklahoma (AP-1 [QB])
 Ray Evans, Kansas (AP-1 [HB])
 Bob Steuber, Missouri (AP-1 [HB])
 Paul Darling, Iowa State (AP-1 [FB])

Ends
 Bert Ekern, Missouri (AP-1)
 W. G. Lamb, Oklahoma (AP-1)

Tackles
 Vic Schleigh, Nebraska (AP-1
 Homer Simmons, Oklahoma (AP-1)

Guards
 Mike Fitzgerald, Missouri (AP-1)
 Clare Morford, Oklahoma (AP-1)

Centers
 Jack Marsee, Oklahoma (AP-1)

Key
AP = Associated Press

See also
1942 College Football All-America Team

References

All-Big Six Conference football team
All-Big Eight Conference football teams